Andrew Snoid (born Andrew McLennan) is a New Zealand musician, singer, and songwriter.

He was featured in bands such as The Plague, The Whizz Kids, Blam Blam Blam (briefly), Pop Mechanix, The Swingers, and Coconut Rough.

Snoid is best remembered as the writer and singer of the Coconut Rough song Sierra Leone, which was a big domestic hit in 1983, staying in the charts for 17 weeks.

Later years
In 2015, he was fronting his group Andrew McLennan and the Underminers, which included  Piri Heihei on guitar and vocals, pianist Michael Larsen formerly with Jan Hellriegel, and on drummer Gary Hunt who had played with the Terrorways and Gary Havoc & The Hurricanes.
Andrew McLennan is currently on a "World Tour at Your Place" with "Telling Tales"   featuring Stephanie Crawford Kim Gruebner Nick Jones Tracey Collins and guests Mark Bell Dave Bridgman and Geoffrey Chunn

References

External links 
 Telling Tales website.

APRA Award winners
New Zealand new wave musicians
Living people
Year of birth missing (living people)